Frederick Howard Buttel (October 15, 1948, Freeport, Illinois – January 14, 2005, Madison, Wisconsin) was the William H. Sewell Professor of Rural Sociology at the University of Wisconsin–Madison. A prominent scholar of the sociology of agriculture, Buttel was well known also for his contributions to environmental sociology.

Early life 
Buttel was "born on a dairy farm [in northwestern Illinois] to Heye R. and Marian (Highbarger) Buttel". His father was a farmer, his mother a school teacher.

Education and career 
Buttel earned his B.S. (1970) and M.S. in Sociology (1972) degrees at the University of Wisconsin–Madison, his master's degree in forestry and environmental studies at Yale University and his Ph.D. in sociology at the University of Wisconsin. Prior to returning as a faculty member to Wisconsin, he served as a member of the faculty at Michigan State University and Cornell University. At the latter, he directed the Biology and Society Program.

Buttel was editor of the journal, Research in Rural Sociology and Development, and co-editor of Society & Natural Resources. Buttel was a scholar in rural sociology whose research focused on four major areas of study: the sociology of agriculture, environmental sociology, technological change in agriculture, and national and global activism relating to environmental and agricultural policies.

Offices and awards 
 Fellow, American Association for the Advancement of Science, 1987
 President, Rural Sociological Society, 1990–1991
 Excellence in Research Award, Rural Sociology Society, 1993
 Distinguished Contribution to Environmental Sociology Award, Section on Environment and Technology, American Sociological Association, 1994
 Chair, Department of Rural Sociology, University of Wisconsin-Madison, 1998–2002
 President, Agriculture, Food and Human Values Society, 1998–1999
 President, Research Committee on Environment and Society (RC24), International Sociological Association, 1998–2002
 Merit Award, Natural Resources Research Group, Rural Sociology Society, 1999
 Spitz Land-Grant Faculty Award, College of Agricultural and Life Sciences, University of Wisconsin-Madison, 2004
 Distinguished Rural Sociologist Award, Rural Sociology Society, 2004
 Wisconsin Alumni Research Foundation Professor, University of Wisconsin, 2004

Recognition 
 After his death, the Research Committee on Environment and Society (RC24) of the International Sociological Association established in his honor the Frederick H. Buttel International Award for Distinguished Scholarship in Environmental Sociology.
 Recognizing his contributions to the field, the Section on Environment and Technology of the American Sociological Association also renamed its Distinguished Contributions Award for him.
 The endowed chair he held at the University of Wisconsin was renamed the Buttel-Sewell Professorship.

Co-authored books 

 Rural Sociology of the Advanced Societies (1980)
 Labor and the Environment (1984)
 The Sociology of Agriculture (1990)
 Toward a New Political Economy of Agriculture (1991)
 Hungry for Profit: The Agribusiness Threat to Farmers, Food, and the Environment (2000)
 Environment and Global Modernity (2000)
 Environment, Energy, and Society: A New Synthesis (2001)
 Sociological Theory and Environment (2002)
 New Directions in the Sociology of Global Development, Volume 11 (2005)
 Governing Environmental Flows: Global Challenges to Social Theory (2006)

See also 

 List of Cornell University faculty
 List of Michigan State University people
 List of Michigan writers
 List of sociologists
 List of University of Wisconsin–Madison people
 List of Yale University people

References

External links 
 "Father's Advice Proved Dependable to Professor," University of Wisconsin-Madison News, November 2, 2004
 "Four Faculty Receive Hilldale Awards," University of Wisconsin-Madison News, April 29, 2002

1948 births
2005 deaths
20th-century scholars
21st-century scholars
Academic journal editors
American print editors
American sociologists
Environmental sociologists
Cornell University faculty
Fellows of the American Association for the Advancement of Science
Michigan State University faculty
University of Wisconsin–Madison College of Letters and Science alumni
University of Wisconsin–Madison faculty
Writers from Michigan
Writers from New York (state)
Writers from Wisconsin
Yale School of Forestry & Environmental Studies alumni
People from Freeport, Illinois
Rural sociologists